William C. Harris (May 7, 1921 – December 30, 2004) was an American businessman and politician.

Biography
Born in Pontiac, Illinois, Harris served in the United States Navy during World War II. He then worked for his family's funeral home in Pontiac, Illinois and was in the insurance business. He served in the Illinois House of Representatives from 1955 to 1961 and was a Republican. Harris then served in the Illinois State Senate from 1961 to 1977. In 1968, Harris unsuccessfully ran for Auditor of Public Accounts. In 1976, he unsuccessfully ran for Illinois Secretary of State. In 1977, Harris was appointed Illinois Commissioner of Banks and Trust Companies.

Notes

1921 births
2004 deaths
People from Pontiac, Illinois
Businesspeople from Illinois
Military personnel from Illinois
Republican Party members of the Illinois House of Representatives
Presidents of the Illinois Senate
Republican Party Illinois state senators
20th-century American politicians
20th-century American businesspeople
United States Navy personnel of World War II